Field Marshal Alan Francis Brooke, 1st Viscount Alanbrooke,  (23 July 1883 – 17 June 1963), was a senior officer of the British Army. He was Chief of the Imperial General Staff (CIGS), the professional head of the British Army, during the Second World War, and was promoted to field marshal on 1 January 1944. As chairman of the Chiefs of Staff Committee, Brooke was the foremost military advisor to Prime Minister Winston Churchill, and had the role of co-ordinator of the British military efforts in the Allies' victory in 1945. After retiring from the British Army, he served as Lord High Constable of England during the Coronation of Queen Elizabeth II in 1953. His war diaries attracted attention for their criticism of Churchill and for Brooke's forthright views on other leading figures of the war.

Background and early life
Alan Brooke was born on 23 July 1883 at Bagnères-de-Bigorre, Hautes-Pyrénées, to a prominent Anglo-Irish family from West Ulster. The Brookes had a long military tradition as the "Fighting Brookes of Colebrooke", with a history of service in the Wars of the Three Kingdoms, the French Revolutionary and Napoleonic Wars, and World War I. He was the seventh and youngest child of Sir Victor Brooke, 3rd Baronet, of Colebrooke Park, Brookeborough, County Fermanagh, and the former Alice Bellingham, second daughter of Sir Alan Bellingham, 3rd Baronet, of Castle Bellingham in County Louth.  Brooke's father died when he was just eight years old.

Brooke was educated at a day school in Pau, France, where he lived until the age of 16; he was bi-lingual in French (which he spoke with a heavy Gascon accent and spoke as a first language as a result of his upbringing in the French Pyrenees) and English. He spoke both French and English very fast, leading some Americans later in life to distrust a "fast-talking Limey." He was also fluent in German, and had learnt Urdu and Persian.

Brooke, desiring a military career, "only just" qualified for the Royal Military Academy at Woolwich in 1900, coming sixty-fifth out of seventy-two in the entrance exam, but passed out at seventeenth. Had he done any better he would have qualified for a commission in the Royal Engineers, as was his initial intension, and possibly would not have ended up on the General Staff after the Great War, showing that initial lack of success could be invaluable later on.

Brooke was commissioned into the Royal Regiment of Artillery as a second lieutenant on 24 December 1902. Due to his high placing at Woolwich Brooke was allowed to choose which branch of the Royal Artillery to join. His choice was the Royal Field Artillery, with which he served in Ireland and India in the years leading up to the outbreak of the First World War in the summer of 1914. He also received his "jacket" upon being selected to join the Royal Horse Artillery.

First World War
During the war, he was assigned to an ammunition column of the Royal Horse Artillery on the Western Front, where he gained a reputation as an outstanding planner of operations. He later was transferred to the 18th Division. At the Battle of the Somme in 1916, he introduced the French "creeping barrage" system, thereby helping the protection of the advancing infantry from enemy machine gun fire. Brooke was with the Canadian Corps from early 1917 and planned the barrages for the Battle of Vimy Ridge. In 1918 he was appointed GSO1 as the senior artillery staff officer in the First Army. Brooke ended the conflict as a lieutenant-colonel with the Distinguished Service Order and Bar and was mentioned in despatches six times.

As with many others of his generation, the war left its mark upon Brooke. In October 1918, shortly before the Armistice of 11 November 1918, he wrote 

When the Armistice did eventually arrive Brooke was in London on leave. He watched the crowds of people celebrating but felt mixed feelings, as he himself later wrote:

Between the wars
During the interwar period, Brooke attended the first post-war course at the Staff College, Camberley in 1919. He managed to impress both his fellow students and the college's instructors during the relatively brief time he was there. He then served as a staff officer with the 50th Division from 1920 to 1923. Brooke then returned to Camberley, this time as an instructor, before attending the Imperial Defence College. He was later appointed as an instructor at the college, and while there he became acquainted with most of the officers who became leading British commanders of the Second World War. From 1929 onwards Brooke held a number of important appointments: Inspector of Artillery, Director of Military Training and then General Officer Commanding (GOC) of the Mobile Division (later the 1st Armoured Division) in 1935. In 1938, on promotion to lieutenant-general, he took command of the Anti-Aircraft Corps (renamed Anti-Aircraft Command in April 1939) and built a strong relationship with Air Chief Marshal Hugh Dowding, the AOC-in-C of Fighter Command, which laid a vital basis of co-operation between the two commands during the Battle of Britain the following year. In July 1939 Brooke moved to command Southern Command. By the outbreak of the Second World War, Brooke was already seen as one of the British Army's foremost generals.

Second World War

Commander in Flanders, France and Britain

Following the outbreak of the Second World War, in September 1939, Brooke commanded II Corps in the British Expeditionary Force (BEF)—which included in its subordinate formations the 3rd Infantry Division, commanded by the then Major-General Bernard Montgomery, as well as Major-General Dudley Johnson's 4th Infantry Division. As corps commander, Brooke had a pessimistic view of the Allies' chances of countering a German offensive. He was sceptical of the quality and determination of the French Army, and of the Belgian Army. This scepticism appeared to be justified when he was on a visit to some French front-line units; and was shocked to see unshaven men, ungroomed horses and dirty vehicles.

He had also little trust in Lord Gort, Commander-in-Chief (C-in-C) of the BEF, whom Brooke thought took too much interest in details while being incapable of taking a broad strategic view. Gort, on the other hand, regarded him as a pessimist who failed to spread confidence, and was thinking of replacing him.  Brooke correctly predicted that the Allied powers' Plan D envisioning an advance along the Meuse would allow the Wehrmacht to outflank them, but British High Command dismissed his warnings as defeatist. 

When the German offensive began Brooke, aided by Neil Ritchie, his Brigadier General Staff (BGS), distinguished himself in the handling of the British forces in the retreat to Dunkirk.  His II Corps faced rapid German Army armored advances following the Allied defeat at the Battle of Sedan. In late May 1940 it held off the major German attack on the Ypres-Comines Canal but then found its left flank exposed by the capitulation of the Belgian army. Brooke swiftly ordered Montgomery's 3rd Division to switch from the Corps' right flank to cover the gap. This was accomplished in a complicated night-time manoeuvre. Pushing more troops north to counter the threat to the embarking troops at the Dunkirk evacuation from German units advancing along the coast, II Corps retreated to their appointed places on the east or south-east of the shrinking perimeter of Dunkirk. Brooke's actions not only saved his own forces from capitulation, but prevented the Germans from seizing the 20-mile gap left by the Belgian surrender and capturing the entire BEF before it could safely evacuate.

Then on 29 May Brooke was ordered by Gort to return to England, leaving the Corps in Montgomery's hands. According to Montgomery, Brooke was so overcome with emotion at having to leave his men in such a crisis that "he broke down and wept" as he handed over to Montgomery on the beaches of La Panne. He was told by Gort to "proceed home ... for (the) task of reforming new armies" and so returned on a destroyer (30 May). Then "on June 2nd set out for the War Office to find out what I was wanted for" with a "light heart" and with no responsibility, and was then told by Dill (CIGS) that he was to "Return to France to form a new BEF"; he later said that hearing the command from Dill was "one of his blackest (moments) in the war". He had already realised that there was no hope of success for the "Brittany plan" (Breton redoubt) to keep an allied redoubt in France. After General Maxime Weygand warned him that the French Army was collapsing and could offer no further resistance, he decided that he needed to convince his superiors to allow him to withdraw his forces to Cherbourg and Brest for evacuation to Britain. He told the Secretary for War Anthony Eden that the mission had "no military value and no hope of success" although he could not comment on its political value. In his first conversation with Prime Minister Winston Churchill (Brooke had been rung by Dill who was at 10 Downing Street) he insisted that all British forces should be withdrawn from France. Churchill initially objected but was eventually convinced by Brooke and around 200,000 British and Allied troops were successfully evacuated from ports in northwestern France.

Home Forces
After returning for a short spell at Southern Command he was appointed in July 1940 to command United Kingdom Home Forces to take charge of anti-invasion preparations. Thus it would have been Brooke's task to direct the land battle in the event of a German amphibious invasion of Great Britain. Contrary to his predecessor General Sir Edmund Ironside, who favoured a static coastal defence, Brooke developed a mobile reserve which was to swiftly counterattack the enemy forces before they were established. A light line of defence on the coast was to assure that the landings were delayed as much as possible. Writing after the war, Brooke acknowledged that he also "had every intention of using sprayed mustard gas on the beaches".

Brooke believed that the lack of a unified command of the three services was "a grave danger" to the defence of the country. Despite this, and the fact that the available forces never reached the numbers he thought were required, Brooke considered the situation far from "helpless" if the Germans were to invade. "We should certainly have a desperate struggle and the future might well have hung in the balance, but I certainly felt that given a fair share of the fortunes of war we should certainly succeed in finally defending these shores", he wrote after the war. But in the end, the German invasion plan was never taken beyond the preliminary assembly of forces.

Chief of the Imperial General Staff

In December 1941 Brooke succeeded Field Marshal Sir John Dill as Chief of the Imperial General Staff (CIGS), the professional head of the British Army, in which appointment he also represented the British Army on the Chiefs of Staff Committee. In March 1942 he succeeded Admiral of the Fleet Sir Dudley Pound as chairman of the Chiefs of Staff Committee.

For the remainder of the Second World War, Brooke was the foremost military adviser to the British Prime Minister, Winston Churchill (who was also Minister of Defence), the War Cabinet, and to Britain's allies. As CIGS, Brooke was the functional head of the British Army, and as chairman of the Chiefs of Staff Committee, which he dominated by force of intellect and personality, he took the leading military part in the overall strategic direction of the British war effort. In 1942, Brooke joined the Western Allies' ultimate command, the U.S.-British Combined Chiefs of Staff. 
Brooke was responsible for commanding the entire British Army; he focused on grand strategy, and his relationships, through the Combined Chiefs of Staff, with his American counterparts.  He was also responsible for the appointment and evaluation of senior commanders, allocation of manpower and equipment and the organization of tactical air forces in support of land operations of field commanders. In addition he had primary responsibility for supervising the military operations of the Free French, Polish, Dutch, Belgian, and Czech units reporting to their governments in exile in London. Brooke vigorously allocated responsibilities to his deputies. Despite the traditional historical distrust that had existed between the military and the political side of the War Office, he got along quite well with his counterpart, the Secretary of State for War, first the Conservative politicians David Margesson and later Sir James Grigg, a former civil servant in the department.

Brooke's focus was primarily on the Mediterranean theatre. Here, his principal aims were to rid North Africa of Axis forces and knock Italy out of the war, thereby opening up the Mediterranean for Allied shipping, and then mount the cross-Channel invasion when the Allies were ready and the Germans sufficiently weakened.

Brooke's and the British view of the Mediterranean operations contrasted with the American commitment to an early invasion of western Europe, which led to several heated arguments at the many conferences of the Combined Chiefs of Staff.

During the first years of the Anglo-American alliance, it was often the British who got their way. At the London Conference in April 1942, Brooke and Churchill seem to have misled General George C. Marshall, the U.S. Army Chief of Staff, about the British intentions on an early landing in France. At the Casablanca Conference in January 1943, it was decided that the Allies should invade Sicily, under the command of General Dwight D. Eisenhower, a decision that effectively postponed the planned invasion of Western Europe until 1944. The Casablanca agreement was in fact a compromise, brokered largely by Brooke's old friend Field Marshal Sir John Dill, Chief of the British Joint Staff Mission in Washington DC. "I owe him [Dill] an unbounded debt of gratitude for his help on that occasion and in many other similar ones", Brooke wrote after the war.

The post of CIGS was less rewarding than command in an important theatre of war but the CIGS chose the generals who commanded those theatres and decided what men and munitions they should have. When it came to finding the right commanders he often complained that many officers who would have been good commanders had been killed in the First World War and that this was one reason behind the difficulties the British had in the beginning of the war. When General Sir Claude Auchinleck was to be replaced as the commander of the British Eighth Army in 1942, Brooke preferred Lieutenant-General Bernard Montgomery (Montgomery was both Brooke's ex-pupil and his protégé ) instead of Lieutenant-General William Gott, who was Churchill's candidate. Soon thereafter Gott was killed when his aircraft was shot down and Montgomery received the command. Brooke would later reflect upon the tragic event which led to the appointment of Montgomery as an intervention by God. Earlier in 1942 Brooke had been offered the command of British forces in the Middle East. Brooke declined, believing he now knew better than any other general how to deal with Churchill.

A year later, the war had taken a different turn and Brooke no longer believed it necessary to stay at Churchill's side. He therefore looked forward to taking command of the Allied invasion of Western Europe, a post Brooke believed he had been promised by Churchill on three occasions. During the first Quebec Conference in August 1943, it was decided that the command would go to General George Marshall. (Although in the event Marshall's work as U.S. Army Chief of Staff was too important for him to leave Washington DC and Dwight D. Eisenhower was appointed instead.) Brooke was bitterly disappointed, both at being passed over and of the way the decision was conveyed to him by Churchill, who according to Brooke "dealt with the matter as if it were one of minor importance".

Brooke or "Brookie" as he was often known, is reckoned to be one of the foremost of all the heads of the British Army. He was quick in mind and speech and deeply respected by his military colleagues, both British and Allied, although his uncompromising style could make the Americans wary.

As CIGS, Brooke had a strong influence on the grand strategy of the Western Allies. The war in the west unfolded more or less according to his plans, at least until 1943 when the American forces were still relatively small in comparison to the British. Among the most crucial of his contributions was his opposition to an early landing in France, which was important for delaying Operation Overlord until June 1944.

He was a cautious general with a great respect for the German war machine. Some American planners thought that Brooke's participation in the campaigns of the First World War and in the two evacuations from France in the Second World War made him lack the aggression they believed necessary for victory. According to Max Hastings, Brooke's reputation as a strategist was "significantly damaged" by his remarks at the Trident Conference in Washington in May 1943, where he claimed that no major operations on the continent would be possible until 1945 or 1946. His diary says that he wanted "operations in the Mediterranean to force a dispersal of German forces, help Russia, and thus eventually produce a situation where cross Channel operations are possible" but that Churchill "entirely repudiated" (or half repudiated) the paper we (the CCOS) had agreed on; Harry Hopkins got him to withdraw his proposed amendments but that Churchill had aroused suspicions with his talk of "ventures in the Balkans."

Relationship with Churchill
During the years as CIGS, Brooke had a stormy relationship with Winston Churchill. Brooke was often frustrated with the Prime Minister's habits and working methods, his abuse of generals and constant meddling in strategic matters. At the same time Brooke greatly admired Churchill for the way he inspired the Allied cause and for the way he bore the heavy burden of war leadership. In one typical passage in Brooke's war diaries Churchill is described as a "genius mixed with an astonishing lack of vision – he is quite the most difficult man to work with that I have ever struck but I should not have missed the chance of working with him for anything on earth!"

Shortly after Japanese attack on Pearl Harbor, Churchill and his senior military staff used the Arcadia Conference in Washington to decide the general strategy for the war. The American Army Chief of Staff George C. Marshall came up with the idea of a Combined Chiefs of Staff that would make final military decisions (subject to approval by President Roosevelt and Churchill). Marshall sold it to Roosevelt and together the two sold the idea to Churchill. Churchill's military aides were much less favorable, and Brooke was strongly opposed. However, Brooke was left behind in London to handle the daily details of running the British war effort, and was not consulted.  The combined board was permanently stationed in Washington, where Field Marshal Dill represented the British half.  The Combined Board did have thirteen in-person full meetings, which Brooke attended.

When Churchill's many fanciful strategic ideas collided with sound military strategy it was only Brooke on the Chiefs of Staff Committee who was able to stand up to the Prime Minister. Churchill said about Brooke: "When I thump the table and push my face towards him what does he do? Thumps the table harder and glares back at me. I know these Brookes – stiff-necked Ulstermen and there's no one worse to deal with than that!" It has been claimed that part of Churchill's greatness was that he appointed Brooke as CIGS and kept him for the whole war.

Brooke was particularly annoyed by Churchill's idea of capturing the northern tip of Sumatra. But in some cases Brooke did not see the political dimension of strategy as the Prime Minister did. The CIGS was sceptical about the British intervention in the Greek Civil War in late 1944 (during the Dekemvriana), believing this was an operation which would drain troops from the central front in Germany. But at this stage the war was practically won and Churchill saw the possibility of preventing Greece from becoming a communist state.

The balance of the Chiefs of Staff Committee was tilted in October 1943 when Admiral Sir Dudley Pound, Brooke's predecessor as chairman, retired as a result of poor health and Admiral Sir Andrew Cunningham succeeded Pound as First Sea Lord and naval representative on the Chiefs of Staff Committee. Brooke as a consequence got a firm ally in his arguments with Churchill. This was reflected in the most serious clash between the Prime Minister and the Chiefs of Staff, regarding the British preparations for final stages of the Pacific War. Brooke and the rest of the Chiefs of Staff wanted to build up the forces in Australia while Churchill preferred to use India as a base for the British effort. It was an issue over which the Chiefs of Staff were prepared to resign, but in the end a compromise was reached.

Despite their many disagreements Brooke and Churchill held an affection for each other. After one fierce clash Churchill told his chief of staff and military adviser, General Sir Hastings Ismay, that he did not think he could continue to work any longer with Brooke because "he hates me. I can see hatred looking from his eyes." Brooke responded to Ismay: "Hate him? I don't hate him. I love him. But the first time I tell him that I agree with him when I don't will be the time to get rid of me, for then I can be no more use to him." When Churchill was told this he murmured, "Dear Brookie."

The partnership between Brooke and Churchill was a very successful one and led Britain to victory in 1945. According to historian Max Hastings, their partnership "created the most efficient machine for the higher direction of the war possessed by any combatant nation, even if its judgments were sometimes flawed and its ability to enforce its wishes increasingly constrained".

Brooke's diary entry for 10 September 1944 is particularly revealing of his ambivalent relationship with Churchill:

War diaries
Brooke kept a diary during the whole of the Second World War. Originally intended for his wife, Benita, the diaries were later expanded on by Brooke in the 1950s. They contain descriptions on the day-to-day running of the British war effort (including some quite indiscreet references to top secret interceptions of German radio traffic), Brooke's thoughts on strategy, as well as frequent anecdotes from the many meetings he had with the Allied leadership during the war.

The diaries have become famous mostly because of the frequent remarks on and criticisms of Churchill. Although the diaries contain passages expressing admiration of Churchill, they also served as a vent for Brooke's frustration with working with the Prime Minister. The diaries also give sharp opinions on several of the top Allied leaders. The American generals Eisenhower and Marshall, for example, are described as poor strategists and Field Marshal Sir Harold Alexander as unintelligent. Among the few individuals of whom Brooke seems to have kept consistently positive opinions, from a military standpoint, were General of the Army Douglas MacArthur, Field Marshal Sir John Dill, and Joseph Stalin. Brooke admired Stalin for his quick brain and grasp of military strategy. Otherwise he had no illusions about the man, describing Stalin thus: "He has got an unpleasantly cold, crafty, dead face, and whenever I look at him I can imagine his sending off people to their doom without ever turning a hair."

The first (abridged and censored) version published in the 1950s was edited by the distinguished historian Sir Arthur Bryant: 1957 (The Turn of the Tide) and 1959 (Triumph in the West). Originally Brooke intended that the diaries were never to be published but one reason that he changed his mind was the lack of credit to him and the Chiefs of Staff in Churchill's own war memoirs, which essentially presented their ideas and innovations as the Prime Minister's own. Although censorship and libel laws accounted for numerous suppressions of what Brooke had originally written concerning persons who were still alive, the Bryant books became controversial even in their truncated state, mainly as a result of the comments on Churchill, Marshall, Eisenhower, Gort, and others. Churchill himself did not appreciate the books. In 1952 both Churchill and Beaverbrook threatened legal action against a biography of Stanley Baldwin by G. M. Young, and a settlement was reached by lawyer Arnold Goodman  to remove the offending sentences. The publisher Rupert Hart-Davis had the "hideously expensive" job of removing and replacing seven leaves from 7,580 copies of the biography. Diary entries also refer to intercepts of German signals decrypted at Bletchley Park (which he visited twice), which were secret until 1974.

In 2001, Alex Danchev of Keele University and Daniel Todman of Cambridge University published an unexpurgated version of the Alan Brooke Diaries including original critical remarks that Alan Brooke made at various times that had been suppressed in the Bryant versions.  Danchev and Todman also criticised Bryant's editing, but this is balanced by an assessment by Dr Christopher Harmon, advisor to the Churchill Centre and Professor at the US Marine Corps University. Bryant was inhibited by Alan Brooke's desire not to publish in full his critical diary entries about people who were still alive when Bryant's books were published.

Post-war career
Following the Second World War and his retirement from the regular army, Lord Alanbrooke, as he was now, who could have chosen almost any honorary position he wanted, chose to be the Colonel Commandant of the Honourable Artillery Company. He held this position from 1946 to 1954. In addition, he served on the boards of several companies, both in industry and in banking. He was director of the Anglo-Iranian Oil Company, the Midland Bank, the National Discount Company and the Belfast Banking Company. Alanbrooke was particularly fond of being a director of the Hudson's Bay Company where he served for eleven years from 1948.

According to historian A. Sangster there was a reason for his choice to work in the private sector - i.e. not to stay in the military. Brooke ended the Second World War not well off: he had to move from his house and publishing his memoirs helped because such books sold well at that time.

Private life and ornithology
Alan Brooke was married twice. After six years of engagement he married Jane Richardson in 1914, a neighbour in County Fermanagh in Ulster. Six days into their honeymoon, the then Alan Brooke was recalled to active duty when the First World War started. The couple had one daughter and one son, Rosemary and Thomas. Jane Brooke died of complications from an operation to repair a broken vertebra following a car accident in 1925 in which her husband was at the steering wheel. Jane's death deeply affected Brooke, who blamed himself for the accident and felt guilt over it for the rest of his life.

He married Benita Lees (1892–1968), daughter of Sir Harold Pelly, 4th Bt., and the widow of Sir Thomas Lees, 2nd Bt., in 1929. The marriage was very happy for the uxorious Brooke and resulted in one daughter and one son, Kathleen and Victor. During the war the couple lived in Hartley Wintney in Hampshire. After the war, the Brookes' financial situation forced the couple to move into the gardener's cottage of their former home, where they lived for the rest of their lives. Their last years were darkened by the death of their daughter, Kathleen, in a riding accident in 1961.

Alan Brooke had a love of nature. Hunting and fishing were among his great interests. His foremost passion, however, was birds. He was a noted ornithologist, especially in bird photography. In 1944, he ordered the RAF not to use an island off the coast of Norfolk as a bombing range because of its significance to nesting roseate terns. He was president of the Zoological Society of London between 1950 and 1954 and vice-president of the Royal Society for the Protection of Birds between 1949 and 1961. He was an honorary member of the Royal Photographic Society from February 1954 until his death.

Death

On 17 June 1963 Alanbrooke suffered a heart attack and died quietly in his bed with his wife beside him. The same day, he had been due to attend the Garter Service in St George's Chapel, Windsor. Nine days later he was given a funeral in Windsor and buried in St Mary's Church, Hartley Wintney.

Honours

United Kingdom
Brooke was created Baron Alanbrooke, of Brookeborough in the County of Fermanagh, in 1945, and Viscount Alanbrooke in 1946. Other awards included:

 Knight of the Garter (KG) in 1946.
 Knight Grand Cross of the Order of the Bath (GCB) in 1942,
 Knight Commander of the Order of the Bath (KCB) in 1940,
 Companion of the Order of the Bath (CB) in 1937
 Member of the Order of Merit (OM) in 1946
 Knight Grand Cross of the Royal Victorian Order (GCVO) in 1953
 Distinguished Service Order in 1916 and Bar in 1918
 ADC General to the King, 1944 to 1946
 Colonel Commandant The Glider Pilot Regiment 19??–1951
 Colonel Commandant Honourable Artillery Company 1946–1954
 Master Gunner, St. James's Park, the ceremonial head of the Royal Regiment of Artillery 1946–1956
 Constable of the Tower of London, 1950–1955
 Colonel Commandant Royal Artillery 19??–1957
 Deputy Lieutenant County of Southampton and the Town of Southampton 1950
 Lord Lieutenant of the County of London 1950–1957

He also served as Chancellor of The Queen's University of Belfast from 1949 until his death. At the Coronation of Queen Elizabeth II he was appointed Lord High Constable of England, thus commanding all troops taking part in the event. In 1993, a statue of Field Marshal Lord Alanbrooke was erected in front of the Ministry of Defence in Whitehall in London. The statue is flanked by statues of Britain's other two leading generals of the Second World War, Viscount Slim and Viscount Montgomery.

Foreign decorations
 Order of Polonia Restituta 1st Class (Poland) (1943)
 Order of Suvorov 1st Class (USSR) (1944)
 Grand Cordon of the Order of Leopold with Palm (Belgium) (1946)
 Croix de Guerre 1940 with Palm (Belgium) (1946)
 Military Order of the White Lion (Czechoslovakia) (1946)
 Grand Cross of the Order of the Redeemer (Greece) (1946)
 Knight Grand Cross of the Order of the Netherlands Lion (1948)
 Croix de guerre (Belgium) (1918)
 Grand Cross of the Order of Christ (Portugal) (1955)

Coat of arms

His coat of arms as issued to him by the College of Arms is: "Or, a cross engrailed per pale Gules and Sable, in dexter chief a crescent for difference."

Memorials
Welbeck College and the Duke of York's Royal Military School named one of their houses after him.

Several military barracks are named after him, such as Alanbrooke Barracks in Paderborn Garrison, Germany, and Alanbrooke Barracks in Topcliffe, North Yorkshire.

In popular culture
Brooke was portrayed in the television drama Churchill and the Generals by Eric Porter and in the film Churchill by Danny Webb.

He is memorably described by the narrator in Anthony Powell's novel, The Military Philosophers (the 9th volume in his roman-fleuve, A Dance to the Music of Time), who refers to:...the hurricane-like imminence of a thickset general, obviously of high rank, wearing enormous horn-rimmed spectacles. He had just burst from a flagged staff-car almost before it had drawn up by the kerb. Now he tore up the steps of the building at the charge, exploding through the inner door into the hall. An extraordinary current of physical energy, almost of electricity, suddenly pervaded the place. I could feel it stabbing through me. This was the CIGS.

References

Bibliography
 
  Alanbrooke's Official Despatch published in 
  Bryant, Arthur. (1957)  The turn of the tide; a history of the war years based on the diaries of Field-Marshal Lord Alanbrooke, chief of the Imperial General Staff via archive.org;  Triumph in the west; a history of the war years based on the diaries of Field-Marshal Lord Alanbrooke, chief of the Imperial General Staff (1959) online free to borrow
A, Danchev and D. Todman. "The Alanbrooke Diaries." Archives-London-British Records Association 27 (2002): 57–74.
 
 

  via archive.org
 
 
 
 
 Hart, B. H. Liddell. "Western War Strategy: A Critical Analysis of the Alanbrooke Diaries." Royal United Services Institution. Journal vol 105 #617 (1960): 52–61.
 
 
 
  (pb 2009) Online via archive.org
 

 Smith, Greg. "British Strategic Culture And General Sir Alan Brooke During World War II" Canadian Military Journal (2017) 1: 32–44. Online version

External links

Alan Brooke, Baron Alanbrooke of Brookeborough : Biography
BBC – Archive – Remembering Winston Churchill – The Alanbrooke Diaries
British Army Officers 1939–1945
Generals of World War II

|-

|-

|-

|-

|-

|-

|-

|-

 
|-

|-

|-

|-

1883 births
1963 deaths
Burials in Hampshire
Graduates of the Royal College of Defence Studies
Anglo-Persian Oil Company
Anti-Aircraft Command officers
British ornithologists
BP people
British Army personnel of World War I
B
British field marshals
British field marshals of World War II
Chancellors of Queen's University Belfast
Chiefs of the Imperial General Staff
Collections of the Liddell Hart Centre for Military Archives
Constables of the Tower of London
Companions of the Distinguished Service Order
Foreign recipients of the Distinguished Service Medal (United States)
Graduates of the Royal Military Academy, Woolwich
Graduates of the Staff College, Camberley
Grand Crosses of the Order of Christ (Portugal)
Grand Crosses of the Order of Polonia Restituta
Grand Crosses of the Order of the White Lion
Knights Grand Cross of the Order of the Bath
Knights Grand Cross of the Royal Victorian Order
Knights of the Garter
Lord High Constables of England
Lord-Lieutenants of the County of London
Members of the Order of Merit
People from Hautes-Pyrénées
Presidents of the Zoological Society of London
Recipients of the Croix de guerre (Belgium)
Recipients of the Order of Suvorov, 1st class
Royal Artillery officers
War Office personnel in World War II
Brooke, Alan
20th-century British zoologists
Viscounts created by George VI
Barons created by George VI
Academics of the Staff College, Camberley